The 2016 Team Speedway Junior World Championship was the 12th FIM Team Under-21 World Championship season. The final took place on 20 August, 2016 at the ICA Maxi Arena in Norrköping, Sweden.Poland won their ninth Team Under-21 World Championship. The Poles accumulated 44 points, with Bartosz Zmarzlik and Paweł Przedpełski scoring 14 points each, to beat Australia by seven points.

Semi-finals

Final 

  Norrköping
 20 August 2016
 Referee:  Mika Laukkanen

Scores

See also 
 2016 Speedway World Cup
 2016 Individual Speedway Junior World Championship

References 

2015
World Team Junior